Stille is the fifth studio album by German duo Lacrimosa. It features a mix of classical instruments and Gothic metal.

Concept
As a concept, Stille connects to the previous release Inferno which is reflected in several tracks. The first track "Der erste Tag [The first Day]" features the recovery from a burning inferno while the last track reviews the principle of hope throughout the history of mankind. "Stolzes Herz" has been called "an ode to hope".

Reception

The album stayed in the German charts for three weeks, peaking at position 64 with the single "Stolzes Herz" being Lacrimosa's first song to enter the German single charts. A retrospective review in 2002 by the German Powermetal magazine praised Stille for its powerful lyrics and true emotions. In contrast, the Visions magazine marked a lack of variation in Tilo Wolff's singing and wrote that the expectations that had been raised by the pre-release single "Stolzes Herz" had not been fulfilled by the full album.

Track listing

References

1997 albums
Lacrimosa (band) albums